Edinaldo Malcher de França Filho (born 2 April 1988) is a Brazilian football defender who currently plays for Águia de Marabá.

References

1988 births
Living people
Brazilian footballers
Association football defenders
Águia de Marabá Futebol Clube players
Sportspeople from Belém